LBJ is a 2016 American political drama film about the beginning of the administration of U.S. President Lyndon B. Johnson following the assassination of U.S. President John F. Kennedy. It was directed by Rob Reiner and written by Joey Hartstone, whose script was on the 2014 Black List. The film stars Woody Harrelson as the titular President, along with Richard Jenkins, Bill Pullman, Kim Allen, Michael Stahl-David, Jennifer Jason Leigh, Jeffrey Donovan, Doug McKeon, C. Thomas Howell, and Michael Mosley.

Principal photography took place in New Orleans, Baton Rouge, Dallas, and Washington, D.C. from September to December 2015. The film premiered at the Toronto International Film Festival on September 9, 2016. It was theatrically released by Electric Entertainment and Vertical Entertainment on November 3, 2017. The film received mixed reviews from critics, who called it "surface skimming" and criticized Harrelson's makeup, with some comparing the film negatively to the 2016 HBO film about Johnson, All the Way.

Plot

The story begins as Vice President Lyndon B. Johnson and his wife, Lady Bird Johnson, greet President John F. Kennedy and First Lady Jackie Kennedy on November 22, 1963, in Dallas, Texas. While Kennedy is warmly greeted by the crowd, a clearly-disgruntled Johnson is virtually ignored.

Four years earlier, Johnson was the Senate Majority Leader, bullying senators into supporting legislation. During one such meeting, Johnson asks fellow Texas Senator Ralph Yarborough why he has not endorsed him for the Democratic presidential nomination in the 1960 election, although he has yet to announce. Yarborough instead plans to support Kennedy, who has been running a public campaign on television and through a series of popular primaries. At the Johnson Ranch in Texas, Robert F. Kennedy asks Johnson directly whether he plans to seek the presidency, and Johnson assures him that he doesn't. Sometime later, "Johnson for President" signs start to appear even though he continues to deny publicly that he plans to run, while Kennedy continues to amass support in the primaries. Johnson's advisors suggest he announce publicly to take some of the publicity away from Kennedy, but he instead plans to make his case at the convention. Privately, Johnson admits that he is also afraid that he can't compete with Kennedy, whose good looks and instant charm have made him loved by the public; a love Johnson himself is scared to find out they would not feel for him. At the convention, as he is whipping votes, Johnson is confronted on his broken promise by Bobby Kennedy, who gets his revenge by correctly analyzing that the tide has turned in their favour. Kennedy wins the nomination on the first ballot.

However, without consulting his brother or advisors like Kenneth O'Donnell, Kennedy asks Johnson to be his running mate. In private, Kennedy says that he can remove Johnson from Congress and make him work for him rather than against him. Johnson himself hopes to turn the vice presidency into a more powerful position. Kennedy and Johnson successfully defeat Richard Nixon and Henry Lodge Jr. in the 1960 election by one of the narrowest margins in history. In his early days as vice president, Johnson tries to increase his power by requesting that all government agencies "cooperate fully with the vice president in the carrying out of these assignments". The president's advisors, contemptuous of Johnson and lined up behind Bobby Kennedy (now the administration's Attorney General), try to block his influence, but Kennedy himself is wary not to antagonize his vice president, appointing O'Donnell to liaise with him on all issues. He appoints him to run his new Equal Employment Opportunity Commission, a part of his program to address civil rights legislation. The first meeting of the commission goes badly as the Cabinet secretaries meant to compose it send aides instead. Aware of his precarious situation, Johnson tells his advisors he will push for compromise on civil rights, knowing that the Southern Democrats, led by his friend and mentor Senator Richard Russell, will oppose any move made by the Kennedys. Although Johnson claims a small victory when he convinces Russell to support equal opportunities in employment in exchange for a manufacturing deal in his native Georgia, neither faction can see eye-to-eye as Russell refuses to consider any other compromises on civil rights, and Kennedy backs Bobby's suggestion that they should go "through him" instead. Following this decision, Johnson is further sidelined and his lack of influence is shown when he attempts to convince Kennedy to appoint his friend Sarah T. Hughes as a federal judge, a recommendation they barely acknowledge. He eventually deduces that Bobby is trying to make him powerless and irrelevant so that he will not be able to contest Bobby's own ambitions to run for the White House in 1968.

Back in Dallas, Johnson hears a shot as they are driven through the streets in their motorcade. The Secret Service get him to safety in a nearby hospital where they tell him that Kennedy has been shot. Kennedy is soon declared dead and Johnson is thrust into the presidency. Although the Secret Service wishes to return Johnson to the White House immediately, he refuses to leave Dallas without Jackie Kennedy, who refuses to leave her husband. To enquire about the legalities of succession, Johnson calls Bobby Kennedy who reluctantly tells him that he can take the oath of office whenever he wants. Against Bobby's wish, Johnson takes the oath aboard Air Force One, with Jackie at his side and Sarah Hughes, the very judge he had once tried to recommend, swearing him in as president. As he returns to Washington, everyone around him reacts uncertainly, unsure what kind of a president he aims to be. His ascension however delights Russell and his southern Democratic block due to his own southern roots and their belief that he will end the push for civil rights legislation. Johnson asks Kennedy's former advisors to remain, while also giving them the choice to leave if they don't feel like serving him. Debate ensues between them as they are unsure whether they should remain with Johnson, or throw their support behind Bobby as Kennedy's heir. Johnson admits his own doubts to his wife, and that he would have rather lost the presidency on his own merits rather than inherit it in such circumstances.

Johnson eventually decides that the best way to heal the nation and to ensure his presidency works is to present himself firmly not just as Kennedy's successor but also as his heir. Although aware that Russell will block his efforts, he rejects his previous strategy of compromise and, when asked whether he supports civil rights himself, he recounts a story about how challenging it was for his cook to cross the south from his home in Washington to his ranch as an African American woman. Johnson asks Kennedy speechwriter Ted Sorensen to write a speech he intends to deliver to a joint session of Congress, while he begins whipping votes for the civil rights bill. The speech was meant to serve as a eulogy for Kennedy and an inaugural address for Johnson himself. Eventually, LBJ delivers his 'Let Us Continue' speech to Congress, to rousing applause from both chambers, a visibly-emotional Senator Yarborough, a displeased but respectful Russell, and a very reluctant Bobby Kennedy, who must surrender the mantle of his brother's legacy to his rival.

A closing text recounts that on July 2, 1964 Johnson signed into law the Civil Rights Act of 1964, fulfilling Kennedy's dream. On November 3 of the same year, he defeated Senator Barry Goldwater in the presidential election, winning 44 states and taking 61.1% of the popular vote, the largest margin of victory since 1820. Over his next term, Johnson pushed through the Great Society legislation, such as the Voting Rights Act of 1965, and establishing programs such as Medicare, Medicaid, and Head Start. However, his escalation of the Vietnam War lead to rising American deaths and intensifying anti-war protests, causing his popularity to plummet by 1968, and causing challenges from within his own party, including from Bobby Kennedy. On March 31, 1968, Johnson declares that he will not seek another presidential term, becoming to date the last sitting president to forgo re-election.

Cast

 Woody Harrelson as Lyndon B. Johnson
 Jennifer Jason Leigh as Lady Bird Johnson
 Michael Stahl-David as Robert F. Kennedy
 Richard Jenkins as Senator Richard Russell
 Bill Pullman as Senator Ralph Yarborough
 Jeffrey Donovan as John F. Kennedy
 Kim Allen as Jacqueline Kennedy
 Brent Bailey as Ted Sorensen
 John Burke as John Connally
 John Ellison Conlee as George Reedy
 Oliver Edwin as Bill Moyers
 Darrel Guilbeau as Jack Valenti
 Gary Grubbs as Senator Everett Dirksen
 C. Thomas Howell as Walter Jenkins
 Wallace Langham as Arthur M. Schlesinger Jr.
 Kate Butler as Juanita Roberts
 Doug McKeon as Hubert Humphrey
 Michael Mosley as Kenneth O'Donnell
 Tim Ransom as Larry O'Brien
 Rich Sommer as Pierre Salinger
 Brian Stepanek as Rufus Youngblood

Production

The script for LBJ, a political-historical drama written by Joey Hartstone, was one of the winners of the 2014 Black List of unproduced screenplays. On June 16, 2015, Woody Harrelson signed on to play the lead role of 36th President Lyndon B. Johnson, while Rob Reiner signed to direct the film. The film was produced by Acacia Entertainment, Savvy Media Holdings, Castle Rock Entertainment, and Star Thrower Entertainment, and financed by Acacia and Savvy Media. Producers on the film are Matthew George, Reiner, Liz Glotzer, Tim White and Trevor White.

Filming
Principal photography on the film began in New Orleans on September 21, 2015. It was also shot in Baton Rouge, Dallas, and Washington, D.C. Principal photography wrapped in December 2015.

Release
The film had its world premiere at the Toronto International Film Festival on September 9, 2016. Shortly after, Electric Entertainment and Vertical Entertainment acquired distribution rights to the film. It was theatrically released on November 3, 2017.

Reception

Box office
LBJ debuted to $1.1 million at 659 theaters, finishing 14th at the box office.

Critical response
On review aggregator website Rotten Tomatoes, the film has an approval rating of 57%, based on 83 reviews, with an average rating of 5.7/10. The site's critical consensus reads, "LBJ loses sight of its complicated subject, ignoring the more intriguing aspects of his personality and career in favor of a frustratingly ordinary biopic treatment." On Metacritic, the film has a weighted average score 54 out of 100, based 19 critics, indicating "mixed or average reviews".

David Ehrlich of IndieWire gave the film a C, and said "Harrelson, who has a gift for squeezing charm out of even his most monstrous characters, leans hard into the contradictory notion that Johnson is a power-hungry humanist. The result is a performance that is both wildly ridiculous and appreciably grounded ... Harrelson’s turn seizes on his unique charisma in order to disentangle LBJ from the policies that have defined his legacy."

TVOvermind critic Nat Berman gave the film a positive review, and praised Reiner's cast selection.

Accolades

See also
 Lyndon B. Johnson in popular culture
 Cultural depictions of Jacqueline Kennedy Onassis
 Cultural depictions of John F. Kennedy

References

External links
 
 

2016 films
Films directed by Rob Reiner
Films scored by Marc Shaiman
Films shot in New Orleans
Films shot in Dallas
Films shot in Washington, D.C.
Castle Rock Entertainment films
Vertical Entertainment films
2010s political drama films
American political drama films
Vietnam War films
American historical films
Films about the assassination of John F. Kennedy
Films set in Dallas
Films set in New Orleans
Films set in Washington, D.C.
2010s historical films
2016 biographical drama films
Films about presidents of the United States
Films about Lyndon B. Johnson
Cultural depictions of John F. Kennedy
Cultural depictions of Robert F. Kennedy
Cultural depictions of Jacqueline Kennedy Onassis
Political films based on actual events
Drama films based on actual events
2016 drama films
2010s English-language films
2010s American films